XHTB-FM is a radio station on 93.3 FM in Cuernavaca, Morelos, Mexico. It carries the @FM contemporary hit radio format.

History
XHTB received its concession on February 8, 1973. It was owned by Carlos Tenorio Benítez and broadcast on 105.9 MHz with 1.873 kW ERP. By the 1990s, XHTB had moved to 93.3 and was broadcasting with 23 kW. In 1998, power was decreased to 10 kW. The known format used in the early 2000s was Extasis Digital until they swapped formats with XHNG-FM in 2011.
In 2017, XHTB converted from the Los 40 format to the similar @FM format, which is owned by Radiorama.

References

External links
Grupo Radiorama Website
 

Contemporary hit radio stations in Mexico
Grupo Radiorama
Radio stations established in 1973
Radio stations in Morelos
Spanish-language radio stations